Mirpur Government High School is a secondary school in Mirpur Shah Ali thana, Dhaka, Bangladesh.

History
The school was established as the Bengali Medium School (বেঙ্গলী মিডিয়াম স্কুল) during the East Pakistan era in 1963.  Bengali Medium School was involved in the Bengali Language Movement, a key forerunner to the Bangladesh Liberation War.

The school came under government control under the Ershad regime, and was given its present name.

Academics
Mirpur Government High School is the only government high school in the greater Mirpur area.  The school operates a double shift, with girls attending in the morning (7:00 AM to 12:00 noon) and boys in the afternoon (12:30 noon to 5:15 PM).

Campus
Mirpur Government High School stands on a  campus.  It consists of one two-storey building constructed in 1963, a newer five-storey building, and a separate building housing a common room.

Groups
There are three groups in this school. Namely- Science & Commerce.

Admissions and fees
In order to be admitted into this school one has to sit for examination. Since it is a government school, it follows all criteria given from the Board of Dhaka.

References

Schools in Dhaka District
High schools in Bangladesh